Carol Burnett is an American comedienne and actress known for her work in film, television and the theater.

Burnett has received 23 Primetime Emmy Award nominations with six wins for her work for her appearances in The Garry Moore Show, Julie and Carol at Carnegie Hall, The Carol Burnett Show and Mad About You. She has also received 18 Golden Globe Award nominations, winning seven of them, for her work on The Carol Burnett Show. She has also been thrice nominated in both the Tony Awards and Grammy Awards, winning one of each.

Burnett has also received various honors including two Peabody Awards, a Screen Actors Guild Life Achievement Award, and a Star on the Hollywood Walk of Fame. In 2003, she was honored with the Kennedy Center Honor. In 2005, she received the Presidential Medal of Freedom awarded to her by President George W. Bush. In 2013 she received the Mark Twain Prize for American Humor.

Major awards

Primetime Emmy Awards

Tony Awards

Grammy Awards

Golden Globe Awards

Critics' Choice Awards

Honors

Peabody Awards

Hollywood Walk of Fame

Television Hall of Fame

Presidential Medal of Freedom

Screen Actors Guild Award

Mark Twain Prize for American Humor

Other honors
1980: Crystal Award – In recognition of her excellence and innovation in her creative works that have enhanced the perception of women through the medium of television
1997: Crystal Award – In recognition of her excellence and innovation in her creative works that have enhanced the perception of women through the medium of television
1998: Grand Marshal of the 109th Rose Parade and the 84th Rose Bowl Game on New Year's Day 
1999: The first honoree and presenter at second annual awards ceremony of the Back Stage West Garland Awards
2003: Kennedy Center Honors recipient
2009: Inducted into the California Hall of Fame at The California Museum for History, Women and the Arts
2014: Recipient of the Golden Plate Award of the American Academy of Achievement. The Golden Plate was presented by Awards Council member Julie Andrews.
 2014: Harvey Award recipient by The Jimmy Stewart Museum on August 12
2019 : First recipient of the Golden Globes, Carol Burnett Lifetime Achievement Award for Television which was named in her honor

References

External links

Carol Burnett  Video produced by Makers: Women Who Make America
Carol Burnett news on Topix.net
John Foster Dulles song
Carol Burnett, The Ed Sullivan Show
Carol Burnett at Emmys.com
Interview with Carol Burnett. Accessed February 11, 2017.
Carol Burnett at The Museum of Broadcast Communications

Lists of awards received by American actor
Awards